Azetidine is a saturated heterocyclic organic compound containing three carbon atoms and one nitrogen atom. It is a liquid at room temperature with a strong odor of ammonia and is strongly basic compared to most secondary amines.

Synthesis and occurrence

Azetidines can be prepared by reduction of azetidinones (β-lactams) with lithium aluminium hydride. Even more effective is a mixture of lithium aluminium hydride and aluminium trichloride, a source of "AlClH2" and "AlCl2H". Azetidine can also be produced by a multistep route from 3-amino-1-propanol.

Regio- and diastereoselective synthesis of 2-arylazetidines could be performed from appropriately substituted oxiranes via ring transformation. It is controlled by Baldwin's Rules with remarkable functional group tolerance. 

Azetidine and its derivatives are relatively rare structural motifs in natural products. They are a component of mugineic acids and penaresidins. Perhaps the most abundant azetidine containing natural product is azetidine-2-carboxylic acid - a toxic mimic of proline.

See also 
 Azete, the unsaturated analog

References

External links
 ChemSynthesis